= Atala oil field =

Oil field in Bayelsa, Nigeria

Atala oil field, also known as OML46 is an oil field located in Bayelsa State, Nigeria. The Atala Oil Field was formerly known as oil mining field (OML) 46. Report has it that for several years, the Atala Oil Field (formerly OML46) was poorly managed by the Bayelsa state government.

== License revoked ==
In April 2020, the federal government of Nigeria, revoked the license of the Atala oil field which belonged to the Bayelsa State Government.
